Pyrene is a genus of small sea snails, marine gastropod mollusks in the family Columbellidae.

Species

Species within the genus Pyrene include:

 Pyrene albinodulosa ogasawarana (Pilsbry, 1904-b)
 Pyrene aspersa (G.B. Sowerby I, 1844) 
 Pyrene decussata (G.B. Sowerby I, 1844)
 Pyrene exima (Reeve, 1859 in 1843-65) 
 Pyrene fasciata G.B. Sowerby I, 1825 
 Pyrene flava (Bruguière, 1789)
 Pyrene morrisoni Willan, 2001
 Pyrene obscura (G.B. Sowerby I, 1844)
 Pyrene obtusa (G.B. Sowerby I, 1832)
 Pyrene ocellatula (Hervier, 1899) 
 Pyrene picta (Reeve, 1859)  
 Pyrene punctata (Bruguière, 1789)
 Pyrene rapaensis K. Monsecour & D. Monsecour, 2018
 Pyrene sorongensis Van Bruggen, 1956 (taxon inquirendum)
 Pyrene splendidula (G.B. Sowerby I, 1844)

 Species brought into synonymy 
 Pyrene aikeni Lussi, 2009: synonym of Sulcomitrella aikeni (Lussi, 2009)
 Pyrene albuginosa (Reeve, 1859) : synonym of  Mitrella albuginosa (Reeve, 1859)
 Pyrene antelmei Viader, 1938: synonym of Mitrella antelmei (Viader, 1938)
 Pyrene atrata (Gould, 1860): synonym of Zafra atrata (Gould, 1860)
 Pyrene aureola Howard, 1963: synonym of Columbella aureomexicana (Howard, 1963)
 Pyrene aureomexicana Howard, 1963: synonym of Columbella aureomexicana (Howard, 1963)
 Pyrene axiaerata Verco, 1910: synonym of Mitrella menkeana (Reeve, 1858)
 Pyrene azora (Duclos, 1840): synonym of Euplica festiva (Deshayes in Laborde & Linant, 1834)
 Pyrene babylonica Hedley, 1907: synonym of Zafra babylonica (Hedley, 1907) (original combination)
 Pyrene beachportensis Verco, 1910: synonym of Anachis beachportensis (Verco, 1910)
 Pyrene bella (Reeve, 1859): synonym of Mitrella albuginosa (Reeve, 1859)
 Pyrene bidentata (Menke, 1843): synonym of Euplica bidentata (Menke, 1843)
 Pyrene blanda (Sowerby, 1844): synonym of Mitrella blanda (G. B. Sowerby I, 1844)
 Pyrene bonariense Castellanos & Deambrosi, 1967: synonym of Astyris bonariensis Castellanos & Deambrosi, 1967
 Pyrene calva Verco, 1910: synonym of Retizafra calva (Verco, 1910)
 Pyrene costulata (Cantraine, 1835): synonym of Amphissa acutecostata (Philippi, 1844)
 Pyrene dartevelli Knudsen, 1956: synonym of Mitrella dartevelli (Knudsen, 1956)
 Pyrene dartevilli Knudsen, 1958: synonym of Mitrella dartevelli (Knudsen, 1956)
 Pyrene deshayesii (Crosse, 1859): synonym of Euplica deshayesii (Crosse, 1859)
 Pyrene dianae (Thiele, 1925): synonym of Decipifus consanguineus (G. B. Sowerby III, 1897)
 Pyrene diminuta (C. B. Adams, 1852): synonym of Parvanachis diminuta (C. B. Adams, 1852)
 Pyrene dolicha Verco, 1910: synonym of Anachis atkinsoni (Tenison Woods, 1876)
 Pyrene dunkeri (Tryon, 1883): synonym of Mitrella bicincta (A. Gould, 1860)
 Pyrene emergens Fischer-Piette & Nicklès, 1946: synonym of Anachis cuspidata (Marrat, 1877)
 Pyrene essingtonensis (Reeve, 1859): synonym of Mitrella essingtonensis (Reeve, 1859)
 Pyrene eustomus Jousseaume, 1876: synonym of Graphicomassa adiostina (Duclos, 1840)
 Pyrene faba (Linnaeus, 1758): synonym of Glabella faba (Linnaeus, 1758)
 Pyrene felina Hedley, 1915: synonym of Anachis miser (G. B. Sowerby I, 1844)
 Pyrene fenestrata Verco, 1910: synonym of Anachis fenestrata (Verco, 1910) (original combination)
 Pyrene filmerae (G. B. Sowerby III, 1900): synonym of Pyrene flava filmerae (G. B. Sowerby III, 1900)
 Pyrene flavida (Lamarck, 1822): synonym of Pyrene flava (Bruguière, 1789)
 Pyrene flexuosus Hutton, 1878: synonym of Zemitrella choava (Reeve, 1859)
 Pyrene floccata (Reeve, 1859): synonym of Mitrella floccata (Reeve, 1859)
 Pyrene freytagi (Maltzan, 1884): synonym of Anachis freytagi (Maltzan, 1884)+* Pyrene fulgurans (Lamarck, 1822): synonym of Pictocolumbella ocellata (Link, 1807)
 Pyrene fuscolineata Thiele, 1930: synonym of Mokumea fuscolineata (Thiele, 1930) (original combination)
 Pyrene gemmulifera Hedley, 1907: synonym of Retizafra gemmulifera (Hedley, 1907) (original combination)
 Pyrene hedleyi Thiele, 1930: synonym of Zafra hedleyi (Thiele, 1930) (original combination)
 Pyrene intricata Hedley, 1912: synonym of Retizafra intricata (Hedley, 1912) (original combination)
 Pyrene iodostoma (Gaskoin, 1852): synonym of Mitrella puella (G. B. Sowerby I, 1844): synonym of Indomitrella puella (G. B. Sowerby I, 1844)
 Pyrene isabellei (d'Orbigny, 1839): synonym of Anachis isabellei (d'Orbigny, 1839)
 Pyrene jaffaensis Verco, 1910: synonym of Aesopus jaffaensis (Verco, 1910) (original combination)
 Pyrene jousseaumei Drivas & Jay, 1997: synonym of Pardalinops jousseaumei (Drivas & Jay, 1997) (original combination)
 Pyrene kobai Golikov, Kussakin, 1962: synonym of Astyris kobai (Golikov & Kussakin, 1962)
 Pyrene kraussi (.B. Sowerby I, 1844): synonym of  Anachis kraussi (G.B. Sowerby I, 1844)
 Pyrene lactea (Kiener, 1834): synonym of Pyrene obtusa (G. B. Sowerby I, 1832)
 Pyrene lacteoides Habe & Kosuge, 1966: synonym of Pardalinops testudinaria (Link, 1807)
 Pyrene langleyi (G. B. Sowerby III, 1897): synonym of Decipifus consanguineus (G. B. Sowerby III, 1897)
 Pyrene ledaluciae Rios & Tostes, 1981: synonym of Eurypyrene ledaluciae (Rios & Tostes, 1981) (original combination)
 Pyrene lightfooti (E. A. Smith, 1901): synonym of Zafrona lightfooti (E. A. Smith, 1901)
 Pyrene ligula (Duclos, 1835): synonym of Mitrella ligula (Duclos, 1835)
 Pyrene lurida Hedley, 1907: synonym of Pyreneola lurida (Hedley, 1907) (original combination)
Pyrene marmorata (Gray, 1839) - probably synonym of Pardalinops marmorata
 Pyrene melvillei (Strebel, 1905): synonym of Anachis isabellei (d'Orbigny, 1839)
 Pyrene melvilli Knudsen, 1956: synonym of Mitrella melvilli (Knudsen, 1956)
 Pyrene mindorensis (Reeve, 1859): synonym of Mitrella mindorensis (Reeve, 1859)
 Pyrene minuscula (Gould, 1860 in 1859-60): synonym of Zafra pumila (Dunker, 1858)
 Pyrene moleculina (Duclos, 1840): synonym of  Mitrella moleculina (Duclos, 1840)
  Pyrene morini Viader, 1938: synonym of Zafra morini (Viader, 1938) (original combination)
 Pyrene natalensis (Tomlin, 1926): synonym of Mitrella natalensis Tomlin, 1926
 Pyrene nodulosa Nowell-Usticke, 1959: synonym of Euplica varians (G. B. Sowerby I, 1832)
 Pyrene ocellata (Link, 1807): synonym of Pictocolumbella ocellata (Link, 1807)
 Pyrene opulens Woolacott, 1957: synonym of Pyrene flava (Bruguière, 1789)
 Pyrene ovulata (Lamarck, 1822): synonym of Conella ovulata (Lamarck, 1822)
 Pyrene pallaryi (Dautzenberg, 1927): synonym of Mitrella pallaryi (Dautzenberg, 1927): synonym of Mitrella canariensis (d'Orbigny, 1840)
 Pyrene pardalina (Lamarck, 1822): synonym of Pardalinops testudinaria (Link, 1807)
 Pyrene parhelena Barnard, 1959: synonym of Zemitrella parhelena (Barnard, 1959) (original combination)
 Pyrene parvula (Dunker, 1847): synonym of Mitrella dichroa (G. B. Sowerby I, 1844)
 Pyrene parvula Viader, 1951: synonym of Mokumea parvula (Viader, 1951) (original combination)
Pyrene phaula (Melvill & Standen, 1901): synonym of Zafra phaula (Melvill & Standen, 1901)
 Pyrene peroniana Hedley, 1913: synonym of Mitrella peroniana (Hedley, 1913) (original combination)
 Pyrene perparvula Viader, 1951: synonym of Mokumea parvula (Viader, 1951)
Pyrene philippinarum Récluz, 1843 - synonym: Parametaria philippinarum Reeve, 1842
Pyrene propinqua (E.A. Smith, 1891): synonym of Pardalinops propinqua (E. A. Smith, 1891)
Pyrene pudica (Brazier, 1877): synonym of Mitrella pudica (Brazier, 1877)
Pyrene purpurea (H. Adams, 1873): synonym of Seminella peasei (Martens & Langkavel, 1871)
 Pyrene regnardi Viader, 1938: synonym of Mitrella regnardi (Viader, 1938) (original combination)
 Pyrene retiaria Tomlin, 1931: synonym of Zafrona isomella (Duclos, 1840)
 Pyrene rhombiferum Röding, 1798: synonym of Pyrene punctata (Bruguière, 1789)
 Pyrene rubra (E. von Martens, 1881): synonym of Mitrella rubra (E. von Martens, 1881) (superseded combination)
 Pyrene rustica (Linnaeus, 1758): synonym of Columbella rustica (Linnaeus, 1758)
 Pyrene sagittifera Thiele, 1930: synonym of Zafra hedleyi (Thiele, 1930)
 Pyrene salmoneus Barnard, 1963: synonym of Astyris salmonea (Barnard, 1963) (original combination)
 Pyrene saviniae Viader, 1951: synonym of Zafra saviniae (Viader, 1951) (original combination)
 Pyrene scripta (Linnaeus, 1758): synonym of  Mitrella scripta (Linnaeus, 1758)
 Pyrene selasphora (Melvill & Standen, 1901): synonym of  Zafra selasphora (Melvill & Standen, 1901)
 Pyrene subcrebraria Pilsbry, 1905: synonym of Pardalinops testudinaria (Link, 1807)
 Pyrene tankervillei (Hervier, 1899): synonym of  Pyrene obtusa (G.B. Sowerby I, 1832)
 Pyrene testudinaria (Link, 1807): synonym of  Pardalinops testudinaria (Link, 1807)
 Pyrene turturina (Lamarck, 1822): synonym of  Euplica turturina (Lamarck, 1822)
 Pyrene tylerae (Griffith & Pidgeon, 1834): synonym of  Pardalinops testudinaria (Link, 1807)
 Pyrene varians (G.B. Sowerby II, 1832): synonym of  Euplica varians (G.B. Sowerby I, 1832)
 Pyrene vercoi Thiele, 1930: synonym of Zafra vercoi (Thiele, 1930) (original combination)
 Pyrene verdensis Knudsen, 1956: synonym of Mitrella verdensis (Knudsen, 1956)
 Pyrene versicolor (G. B. Sowerby I, 1832): synonym of Euplica scripta (Lamarck, 1822)
 Pyrene vulpecula (G. B. Sowerby I, 1844): synonym of Pardalinops testudinaria (Link, 1807)
 Pyrene zebra (Wood, 1828): synonym of Anachis miser (G. B. Sowerby I, 1844)

References

OBIS Indo-Pacific Molluscan Database
 Vaught, K.C. (1989). A classification of the living Mollusca. American Malacologists: Melbourne, FL (USA). . XII, 195 pp

External links
 Röding, P.F. (1798). Museum Boltenianum sive Catalogus cimeliorum e tribus regnis naturæ quæ olim collegerat Joa. Fried Bolten, M. D. p. d. per XL. annos proto physicus Hamburgensis. Pars secunda continens Conchylia sive Testacea univalvia, bivalvia & multivalvia. Trapp, Hamburg. viii, 199 pp.
 Swainson, W. (1840). A treatise on malacology or shells and shell-fish. London, Longman. viii + 419 pp

Columbellidae